Cumia lucasi is a species of sea snail, a marine gastropod mollusk in the family Colubrariidae.

Description
The shell size is 11 mm

Distribution
This species occurs in the Indian Ocean off Madagascar.

References

 Bozzetti, L., 2007. Fusus lucasi (Gastropoda: Hypsogastropoda: Colubrariidae) nuova specie dal Madagascar meridionale. Malacologia Mostra Mondiale 54: 11-12

Colubrariidae
Gastropods described in 2007